Two ships of the Royal Navy have been named HMS Murray, after Vice-Admiral Sir George Murray:

  was an  launched in 1914 and sold in 1921.
  was a  launched in 1955 and sold in 1970.

Royal Navy ship names